Timothy B. Ering is an U.S. illustrator best known for his pencil drawings in the book The Tale of Despereaux by Kate DiCamillo.

Publications
As author and illustrator
The Almost Fearless Hamilton Squidlegger (Candlewick, 2014)
Necks Out for Adventure: The True Story of Edwin Wiggleskin (Candlewick, Jan 2008)
The Story of Frog Belly Rat Bone (2003)

As illustrator only
Finn Throws a Fit! by David Elliott (2009)
Mr. and Mrs. God in the Creation Kitchen, by Nancy Wood (2007)
Don't Let the Peas Touch!, by Deborah Blumenthal (Arthur A. Levine, Oct 2004)
The Tale of Desperaux, by Kate DiCamillo (2003)
Sad Doggy, by Jennifer B. Lawrence (Piggy Toes, 2001)

References

External links

 

Living people
American children's book illustrators
Year of birth missing (living people)
Place of birth missing (living people)